Lågheiane or Lågheia is a mountain ridge in Hustadvika Municipality in Møre og Romsdal county, Norway. From the top of the ridge, there is a nice view of the village of Elnesvågen and the inner part of Hustadvika. At the peak, there is a notebook that hikers can sign.

See also
List of mountains of Norway

References

Mountains of Møre og Romsdal
Hustadvika (municipality)